Juan Pablo Sorín (born 5 May 1976) is an Argentine former footballer and current sports broadcaster, who played as a left-back or left midfielder. He had a successful club career in his native Argentina with River Plate, in Brazil with Cruzeiro, and with various teams in Europe, including Barcelona, Lazio, Paris Saint-Germain and Villarreal. At international level, he represented Argentina at two FIFA World Cups, and was the captain of Argentine side at the 2006 FIFA World Cup; he also represented his nation in two editions of Copa América, and the 2005 FIFA Confederations Cup.

Early and personal life
Sorín was born in Buenos Aires, Argentina, and is Jewish. He has written a book called Grandes Chicos ("Big Kids" or "Big Little People") to raise funds for the building of a school and a children's hospital in Argentina.  He currently lives in Belo Horizonte, Brazil, and worked as a pundit for ESPN Brasil from 2012 to 2017.

Club career

Early career 
Nicknamed Juampi, as he is often known in Argentina, Sorín began his career playing in the lower-reaches of the Argentine league for Argentinos Juniors, a Buenos Aires football club. He broke into the first team in 1994 and during the 1995–96 season, after he captained the Argentina Under-20 side who won the 1995 FIFA World Youth Championship played in Qatar, his contract was bought by Italian club Juventus. However, he struggled to find space in an already established first-team under manager Marcello Lippi, totalling only four appearances for the club; as such, he soon returned to Argentina.

Sorín played for River Plate in the second half of 1996, and revived his career, winning three Apertura championships (1996, 1997 and 1999), one Clausura championship (1997), one Copa Libertadores in 1996 and a Supercopa Sudamericana in 1997.

Cruzeiro and Lazio

He was transferred to Cruzeiro of Brazil in 2000. He played for two and a half seasons, winning the 2000 Copa do Brasil and becoming one of the most cherished players by the fans up to this day.

After the 2002 Copa do Brasil ended, he signed for Lazio on loan in July 2002.

Barcelona and PSG 
After an injury-plagued half-season at Lazio in Italy, where he only played six league games, Sorin was acquired by FC Barcelona, occupying the non-EU quota along with Juan Román Riquelme and Roberto Bonano. He made his La Liga debut on 9 February 2003 in a 2–2 draw against Athletic Bilbao. In total he made 15 appearances and scored one goal. He scored on the final matchday of the 2002–03 La Liga season in a 2–0 victory over Celta de Vigo. 

After a successful half-season he left the Nou Camp in the summer of 2003 and was loaned out to Paris Saint-Germain, where he won the 2003–04 Coupe de France. 

Sorín returned to Cruzeiro in 2004 and played the 2004 Campeonato Brasileiro Série A.

Villarreal
In November 2004, Sorín transferred to Spanish side Villarreal on a free transfer. He scored his first goal for the club on 20 February 2005, a game-winner in the last minute of the game to give Villarreal a 3–2 victory against Atlético Madrid. He scored three more goals during the season to help Villarreal finish third in the league table for the 2004–05 season and earn qualification to the Champions League. In the 2005–06 league season, Sorín made 20 appearances and scored 3 goals. He made 13 appearances in the 2005–06 UEFA Champions League and scored a goal in the qualifying stages against Everton, helping the club reach the semi-finals, where they were beaten by Arsenal.

Hamburg
Sorín was reportedly the subject of interest from English Premiership sides Portsmouth, Bolton Wanderers and Newcastle United during the summer of 2006, but ended up signing for Hamburger SV in August 2006. He signed a three-year contract on a €3m transfer fee. After two years with the German club and only 24 appearances because of injury, Sorín left when his contract expired on 15 July 2008.

Second Return to Cruzeiro and Retirement
Sorín returned again to Cruzeiro on 29 August 2008. He signed a contract until the end of season, with the option to renew for two more years. He played his only match since his return in a Série A game on 14 June 2009, and after another injury-riddled year with Cruzeiro, he announced his retirement on 28 July 2009.

International career
Sorín made his Argentina debut in 1995. His first major tournament participation was at the 1999 Copa América, where Argentina were eliminated by eventual winners Brazil in the quarter-finals. 

Sorín was part of the Argentine squad in the 2002 FIFA World Cup held in Japan and South Korea. He played and started all three matches against Nigeria, England and Sweden. However the team performed poorly, and were eliminated in the group stage. 

Sorín played at the 2004 Copa América, scoring a goal in a 3–0 victory against Colombia. He started 5 out of 6 possible matches, missing the match against Uruguay. Argentina lost the final to Brazil 2–4 on penalties after a 2–2 draw following 90 minutes. The next year, Sorín played at the 2005 Confederations Cup. He played and started every match, as Argentina lost in the final to Brazil again 4–1. 

The Argentine squad was then rebuilt by José Pekerman and Sorín was made captain of his country for the 2006 FIFA World Cup in Germany. Sorín played an important role in the World Cup for Argentina as an effective attacking full-back. Argentina qualified for the second round after taking care of Ivory Coast (2–1) and crushing Serbia and Montenegro 6–0. After defeating Mexico in extra time, Argentina went on to the quarter-finals where they lost to hosts Germany on a penalty-shoot out.

Style of play
Sorín was a strong, versatile, and hardworking left-back, who could also play as a centre-back, or anywhere on the left wing, due to his passing and crossing ability with his left foot. He had an eccentric style of play, and despite being played predominantly in defensive roles, he often made attacking runs into more offensive positions, where he used his technical skills and aggressive heading ability to great effect.

Career statistics

Club

International

Scores and results list Argentina's goal tally first, score column indicates score after each Sorín goal.

Honours
River Plate
 Argentine Primera División: 1996 Apertura, 1996 Clausura, 1997 Apertura, 1999 Apertura
 Copa Libertadores: 1996
 Supercopa Libertadores: 1997

Cruzeiro
 Copa do Brasil: 2000
 Copa Sul-Minas: 2001, 2002
 Campeonato Mineiro: 2009

Paris Saint-Germain
 Coupe de France: 2003–04

Argentina
 FIFA World Youth Championship: 1995
 Pan American Games: 1995

Individual
South American Team of the Year: 1996, 2000, 2001
Bola de Prata: 2000
UNFP Player of the Month: April 2004

See also
List of select Jewish association football (soccer) players

References

External links

 
 Lega Serie A Profile 

1976 births
Living people
Footballers from Buenos Aires
Association football midfielders
Association football defenders
Argentine Jews
Argentine footballers
Argentina youth international footballers
Argentina under-20 international footballers
Argentina international footballers
Argentinos Juniors footballers
Cruzeiro Esporte Clube players
FC Barcelona players
Paris Saint-Germain F.C. players
Club Atlético River Plate footballers
Jewish Argentine sportspeople
Jewish footballers
Juventus F.C. players
S.S. Lazio players
Villarreal CF players
Hamburger SV players
Bundesliga players
La Liga players
Copa Libertadores-winning players
2002 FIFA World Cup players
2006 FIFA World Cup players
2005 FIFA Confederations Cup players
1999 Copa América players
2004 Copa América players
Expatriate footballers in Brazil
Expatriate footballers in Germany
Expatriate footballers in Spain
Expatriate footballers in France
Expatriate footballers in Italy
Argentine expatriate sportspeople in Brazil
Argentine expatriate sportspeople in France
Argentine expatriate sportspeople in Germany
Argentine expatriate sportspeople in Italy
Argentine expatriate sportspeople in Spain
Serie A players
Ligue 1 players
Campeonato Brasileiro Série A players
Argentine expatriate footballers
Argentine Primera División players
Pan American Games gold medalists for Argentina
Pan American Games medalists in football
Footballers at the 1995 Pan American Games
Medalists at the 1995 Pan American Games